This is a list of the scorpions of Trinidad and Tobago. The first synopsis of the scorpion fauna came from E. N. Kjellesvig-Waering in 1966 with a total of 8 species. Work by Oscar Franke and Julius Boos, Wilson R. Lourenço & D. Huber and Lorenzo Prendini brought the total to ten species with eight on Trinidad and six on Tobago. Of the ten species seven are endemic to the islands.

Buthidae
 Ananteris cussinii Borelli, 1910 – Trinidad and Tobago and northern South America
 Microtityus rickyi Kjellesvig-Waering, 1966 – endemic to Trinidad and Tobago 
 Microtityus starri Lourenço & Huber, 1999 – endemic to Tobago 
 Tityus clathratus C. L. Koch, 1844 – Trinidad and northern South America
 Tityus tenuicauda Prendini, 2001 – endemic to Trinidad
 Tityus melanostictus Pocock, 1893 – Trinidad and northern South America
 Tityus trinitatis Pocock, 1897 – endemic to Trinidad and Tobago

Chactidae
 Broteochactas laui Kjellesvig-Waering, 1966 – endemic to Tobago
 Broteochactas nitidus Pocock, 1893 – endemic to Trinidad and Tobago
 Chactas raymondhansorum Francke & Boos, 1986 – endemic to Trinidad and Tobago

References

See also
Natural history of Trinidad and Tobago

 Scorpions
Scorpions
 
Trinidad